Charles Pierce "Chuck" Davey (May 3, 1925 – December 4, 2002) was an American welterweight boxer and boxing commissioner for the state of Michigan.

Career 

Davey's official record contains 42 winning bouts (including 26 knockouts), 5 losses (2 knockouts), and 2 draws. Some of his more notable opponents included Rocky Graziano, Ike Williams, and Carmen Basilio. He originally boxed for the Michigan State University team, and was a member of  Team USA for boxing in the 1948 Summer Olympics.

Davey's style was considered unique at the time because he was left-handed and often referred to as a southpaw. This initial upstart resulted in 39 straight wins until he met with Kid Gavilán (often written "Kid Gavilan" at the time) in 1953. The shadow of his first loss followed Davey for a long time:

Davey, a southpaw powderpuff puncher with fancy-Dan footwork, stayed on even terms with Gavilan for the first two rounds. In Round 3, Gavilan opened up with one of his famed flurries, pummeling with lefts, rights and his own uppercutting bolo punch. Davey, bewildered by the barrage, was dumped to the canvas for a nine count, the first time he had ever been knocked down. From then on it was just a matter of time, and Gavilan took his time. In Rounds 5 and 6, Gavilan switched styles and fought southpaw too, "just for the fun of it.

The article, entitled "Fallen Idol," seemed to tarnish Davey's once pristine boxing career. Shortly after the loss to Gavilan, Davey retired and became Michigan's boxing commissioner. Once his boxing career ended completely, Davey worked in the insurance business and spent much of his time traveling and raising his family.

Family 

Davey was born to parents John Leo and Virginia. His mother's side of the family, her maiden name being Pierce, owned a large portion of land in Oscoda, Michigan on Lake Van Etten, which is located beside Wurtsmith Air Force Base. During the Great Depression, Barnard and Virginia Pierce sold most of the land which they owned, including Loud Island, to several developers and private landowners. What land the Pierce family kept and built cottages and homes on resides on a point of land jutting into the waters of Lake Van Etten, giving it the name "Pierce's Point."
Davey was one of four siblings— older brother John Leo II, younger brother Berten Miles, and sister Margaret.

While Davey spent most of his youth and adulthood in the metro-Detroit area, he summered in Oscoda with his parents and brothers, his wife Patricia, and his nine children: Maureen, Charles Pierce II, Patrick, Cathleen, Colleen, Kerry, Laurie, Michael, and Joseph. In his spare time he traveled much of the world and maintained an active lifestyle, sometimes running marathons into his mid sixties and early seventies. He had 26 grandchildren.

Accident and death 

In 1998, while swimming in the ocean, he was picked up by a wave and slammed onto the shore line. He broke a vertebra in his neck, leaving him paralyzed from the neck down. Davey died on December 4, 2002, at the age of 77, of complications resulting from his paralysis.

References

1925 births
2002 deaths
Boxers from Michigan
Olympic boxers of the United States
Fordson High School alumni
American male boxers
People from Oscoda, Michigan
Boxers at the 1948 Summer Olympics
Welterweight boxers

External links